Violeta (Violeta) is a female given name. Notable people with the name include:

 Violeta Andrei (born 1941), Romanian actress
 Violeta Ayala (born 1978), Bolivian film director, producer and writer
 Violeta Chamorro (born 1929), Nicaraguan political leader, former president and publisher
 Violeta Dinescu (born 1953), Romanian composer, pianist and professor
 Violeta Isfel (born Ana Fanni Portolatin, 1985), Mexican actress and singer
 Violeta G. Ivanova, Bulgarian astronomer
 Sati (Lithuanian singer) (Violeta Jurkonienė) (born 1976), Lithuanian singer
 Violeta Laužonytė (born 1955), Lithuanian textile artist
 Violeta Luna (born 1943), Ecuadorian poet, novelist, essayist, professor and literary critic
 Violeta Manushi (1926–2007), Albanian actress
 Violeta Maslarova (1925–2006), Bulgarian artist 
 Violeta Menjívar (born 1952), Salvadoran politician
 Viki Miljković (Violeta "Viki" Miljković) (born 1974), Serbian singer
 Violeta Ninova, Bulgarian rower
 Violeta Parra (1917–1967), Chilean composer, songwriter, folklorist, ethnomusicologist and visual artist
 Violeta Retamoza (born 1983), Mexican professional golfer
 Violeta Slović, Serbian football defender
 Violeta Strămăturaru (born 1988), Romanian luger
 Violeta Szekely (born 1965), Romanian former middle distance runner
 Violeta Tarasovienė (born 1974), Lithuanian singer and show host
 Violeta Tsvetkova (born 1955), Bulgarian middle distance runner
 Violeta Urmana (born Violeta Urmanavičiūtė), Lithuanian operatic soprano
 Violeta Zúñiga (1933–2019), Chilean human rights activist

See also 

 Violetta (given name), a female given name
 Violette (given name), a female given name
 Violet (given name), a female given name
 Viola (given name), a female given name
 Viorica, a female given name
 Eta (given name), a female given name

Feminine given names
Given names derived from plants or flowers
Spanish feminine given names
Portuguese feminine given names
Romanian feminine given names
Lithuanian feminine given names
Albanian feminine given names
Serbian feminine given names
Bulgarian feminine given names
Greek feminine given names